The 2011 NCAA Division I Men's Swimming and Diving Championships were contested in March 2011 at the University Aquatic Center at the University of Minnesota in Minneapolis, Minnesota at the 88th annual NCAA-sanctioned swim meet to determine the team and individual national champions of Division I men's collegiate swimming and diving in the United States.

California topped the team standings, finishing 23.5 points ahead of defending champions Texas. It was the Golden Bears' third overall national title and first since 1980.

Team standings
Note: Top 10 only
(H) = Hosts
(DC) = Defending champions
Full results

See also
List of college swimming and diving teams

References

NCAA Division I Men's Swimming and Diving Championships
NCAA Division I Swimming And Diving Championships
NCAA Division I Men's Swimming And Diving Championships
NCAA Division I Men's Swimming and Diving Championships